Martin Austin Fido (18 October 1939 – 2 April 2019) was a university professor, true crime writer and broadcaster. His many books include The Crimes, Detection and Death of Jack the Ripper, The Official Encyclopedia of Scotland Yard, Serial Killers, and The Murder Guide to London.  He is also one of the authors of The complete Jack the Ripper A to Z.

After leaving Balliol College, Oxford, in 1966, where he had been a junior research fellow in English, he went to the University of Leeds where he lectured in English until 1973.  In 1971 he went to Michigan State University in the USA where he was a visiting associate professor for one year, and in 1973 he became a reader in English Literature and head of the English department at the University of the West Indies, Cave Hill Campus, Barbados. In the West Indies he was active in theatre and educational broadcasting.

In 1983 he returned to England and became a freelance writer and broadcaster, specialising in true crime. He broadcast a weekly radio programme called Murder After Midnight on London's LBC Radio from 1987 to 2001, some of which were produced and released commercially on cassette and CD by his friend (and fellow LBC broadcaster) Paul Savory.  Aside from his many true crime books he has also written illustrated biographies of Charles Dickens, William Shakespeare, Rudyard Kipling and Oscar Wilde, and books on Agatha Christie, and Sherlock Holmes. He translated Louis Cazamian's Le Roman Social en Angleterre, and his play Let's Go Bajan! was performed successfully in Barbados and London.

A number of Murder After Midnight stories are available on iTunes with additional titles planned for early 2013 release.

In 2000 he settled in Cape Cod, Massachusetts, USA, to help his third wife (Karen, née Sandel, died October 2013) nurse her parents through their terminal illnesses, and from 2001 until his death he taught writing and research at Boston University.

Martin Fido died on 2 April 2019 of complications resulting from having suffered a fall.

References

1939 births
2019 deaths
People from Penzance
Writers from Cornwall
Alumni of Balliol College, Oxford
University of the West Indies academics
British non-fiction crime writers